Gandhi Market officially called as Mahatma Gandhi Market, is a wholesale farmers' market in the city of Tiruchirappalli in Tamil Nadu, India.

History 
Its construction began as the Fort Market in 1867 and completed in 1868. The market was expanded in 1927, when P. Rathinavelu Thevar was the mayor of Tiruchirappalli and renamed as Mahatma Gandhi market after Mahatma Gandhi.

See also 
 Golden Rock Shandy
 Koyambedu Wholesale Market Complex

Notes

References 
 

Economy of Tiruchirappalli
Wholesale markets in India
Commercial buildings completed in 1868
Buildings and structures in Tiruchirappalli